Ononis rotundifolia, commonly known as round-leaved restharrow, is a perennial shrub belonging to the genus Ononis of the family Fabaceae.

Description
The stem and the leaves are slightly hairy and sticky. The leaves are composed of three irregularly toothed and almost rounded leaflets (hence the specific Latin name rotundifolia), the  median one with a long petiole. The flowering period extends from June through September. Ononis rotundifolia is also used as an ornamental plant.

Gallery

Distribution
This quite rare north-western Mediterranean shrub occurs in Austria, Switzerland, Italy, France and Spain, mainly in the Alps, the Cevennes and the Pyrenees.

Habitat
These plants prefer calcareous soils in dry grasslands, rocky meadows, slopes or hillsides.

Subspecies
Ononis rotundifolia var. aristata DC.
Ononis rotundifolia var. orbiculata Rouy in Rouy & Foucaud

References
 Pignatti, S. - Flora d'Italia - Edagricole – 1982
 Tutin, T. G., et al., eds. 1964–1980. Flora Europaea

External links

 Biolib
 FloreAlpes 

rotundifolia
Flora of Europe
Plants described in 1753
Taxa named by Carl Linnaeus